Peter Burke may refer to:

Peter Burke (barrister) (1811–1881), English serjeant-at-law
Peter Burke (Gaelic footballer) (born 1976), played for Mayo
Peter Burke (historian) (born 1937), British historian and professor
Peter Burke (Irish footballer), Irish association footballer
Peter Burke (footballer, born 1912) (1912–1979), English association footballer for Norwich City, Oldham Athletic and Southport
Peter Burke (politician) (born 1982), Fine Gael TD for Longford–Westmeath
Peter Burke (rugby union) (1927–2017), New Zealand rugby union player and coach
Peter Burke, a White Collar character
Peter Burke (Australian footballer) (born 1964), Australian rules footballer
Peter Burke (soccer), Australian association footballer